Calluga punctinervis is a moth in the family Geometridae. It is found on Borneo.

The ground colour is ochreous fawn with dark brown fasciation. The postmedial lines have a clear band of ground colour distal to them.

References

Moths described in 1976
Eupitheciini
Moths of Indonesia